Genoplesium despectans, commonly known as the sharp midge orchid and known as Corunastylis despectans in Australia, is a small terrestrial orchid endemic to south-eastern Australia. It has a single thin leaf fused to the flowering stem and up to forty five small, dark purple or green and purple flowers.

Description
The flowers are inverted so that the labellum is above the column rather than below it. There is a narrow lance-shaped callus in the centre of the labellum and extending almost to its tip. Flowering occurs between December and April.

Taxonomy and naming
The sharp midge orchid was first formally described in 1858 by Joseph Dalton Hooker who gave it the name Prasophyllum despectans and published the description in Flora Antarctica. In 1989, David Jones and Mark Clements changed the name to Genoplesium despectans and in 2002 changed the name again to Corunastylis despectans. The specific epithet (despectans) is derived from a Latin word meaning "to look down upon".

Distribution and habitat
Genoplesium despectans grows in heath and heathy forest south from Wollongong in New South Wales and is common and widespread in Victoria. It also found in the south-east of South Australia and in Tasmania.

References

External links
 
 

despectans
Endemic orchids of Australia
Orchids of New South Wales
Orchids of South Australia
Orchids of Tasmania
Orchids of Victoria (Australia)
Plants described in 1858